Fatuma Ali Saman (born 1968) is a Kenyan educationist and women's rights campaigner and a board member of Kenya's Independent Policing Oversight Authority (KIPOA).

Early life 
Fatuma Ali Saman was born in Mandera, Northern Kenya in 1968. She lost her father at a young age.

Education 
Saman attended St Brigid's School in Nairobi during the post-independence period when the "7-4-2-3 system" was in place. She went on to Wajir girls Secondary School in 1983, leaving in 1986 with grades that qualified her to be admitted to university. However, in 1987, she went to train as a teacher at Asumbi College in South Nyanza, near Kenya's western region. She later went to university, graduating with a bachelor's degree in Education, Religion and History.

Teaching career 
Saman has been actively teaching for 25 years at both private and public institutions. Her first teaching post was in 1989 at Mandera boys town (currently known as Mandera Islamic Centre) which was a government school. In 1993, she became deputy head teacher of Khadija Ummul-Muminun, a government-owned girls' primary school. Later on, Fatuma Co-founded Nairobi Muslim Academy, which provides primary and secondary level education. She remains an advisor at the school.

In 2010, Saman was appointed to serve in the task-force on devolved government. She left active teaching in 2012, after she was appointed a board Member of IPOA during the Kenya Coalition government.

Fighting for women's rights 
Saman has been an activist for the rights and representation of women in Kenya. She has lobbied for the accommodation of women in public and private leadership positions and their inclusion in various decision-making organs. Her contribution goes as far as the bill of rights and devolution chapters are concerned in the constitution. The introduction of new Kenya constitution, inaugurated in 2010, possess the two significant parts where Fatuma was a member of the technical committee on bill of rights during the formulation of the Constitution, also known as the Bomas draft. Fatuma advocated for the creation of the positions of 47 women representatives in the Kenyan parliament. She has spearheaded girls' enrolments in schools in Northern Kenya and also fought against female genital mutilation. The objective of founding of Nairobi Muslim, a girls only mixed secondary school in Nairobi Kenya, was to provide a friendly environment for girl child education since majority were affected by early marriage.  Through her work in Muslim women, Saman represented Kenya in the international Visitors leadership program in the United States in 2005.

Community service 
Saman has voluntarily served different organizations from community based to faith based organizations through provision of consultancy services. Fatuma served the Inter-religious council of Kenya (IRCK) as a member of the executive committee for 10 years. Her teaching career was driven by the scarcity of teachers which was affecting the quality and standard of education. Fatuma has taught in different schools and helped boost enrolment of orphaned girls through scholarships. Since 1995, Fatuma, through Nairobi Islamic charitable Waqf, a charity organization she co-founded, has been empowering poor, widowed and divorced women from the Nairobi slums through training and provision of job opportunities. Through her networks, Fatuma supported vulnerable girls in accessing education through different scholarship programmes.

Human rights and reforms 
Fatuma Ali Saman has played a significant role in fighting for freedom and equality in Kenya. One of her biggest achievements includes bringing change to the Kenya police which has been accused of human rights violations in the past. As a board member of the Independent policing and Oversight authority, where Fatuma chairs the inspections, research and monitoring committee, she has developed recommendations to improve the service.

References

External links 

1968 births
Living people
Kenyan activists
Kenyan women activists
Kenyan women's rights activists
Kenyan educators